Haemulidae is a family of fishes in the order Perciformes known commonly as grunts. It is made up of the two subfamilies Haemulinae (grunters) and Plectorhynchinae (sweetlips), which in turn contain about 133 species in 19 genera. These fish are found in tropical fresh, brackish, and salt waters around the world. They are bottom-feeding predators, and named for the ability of Haemulinae to produce sound by grinding their teeth. They also engage in mutualistic relationship with cleaner gobies of genus Elacatinus, allowing them to feed on ectoparasites on their bodies.

Timeline

Subfamilies and genera
The family Haemulidae is divided into the following subfamilies and genera:

 Haemulinae
 Anisotremus Gill 1861
 Boridia Cuvier, 1830
 Brachydeuterus Gill, 1862
 Conodon Cuvier, 1830
 Emmelichthyops Schultz, 1945
 Haemulon Cuvier, 1829
 Haemulopsis Steindachner, 1869
 Inermia Poey, 1860
 Isacia Jordan & Fesler, 1893
 Microlepidotus Gill, 1862
 Orthopristis Girard, 1858
 Parakuhlia Pellegrin, 1913
 Pomadasys Lacépède, 1802
 Xenichthys Gill, 1862
 Xenistius Jordan & Gilbert, 1883
 Xenocys  Jordan & Bollman, 1890
 Plectorhynchinae
 Diagramma Oken, 1817
 Genyatremus Gill, 1862
 Parapristipoma Bleeker, 1873
 Plectorhinchus Lacépède, 1802

See also
 List of fish families

Notes

References